Guy Potter Benton (May 26, 1865 – June 29, 1927) was an American educator who served as president of the following universities: Upper Iowa University from 1899-1902, Miami University from 1902–1911, the University of Vermont from 1911–1920, and the University of the Philippines from 1921–1923. He is credited with being instrumental in the founding of the sorority Delta Zeta at Miami University in 1902.

Benton was an alumnus of Ohio Normal University (now Ohio Northern University), Ohio Wesleyan University, Baker University and the College of Wooster.

Life
He was born to Daniel Webster and Harriett (Wharton) Benton in Kenton, Ohio. After serving as superintendent of schools at Fort Scott, Kansas (1890–95), he became assistant state superintendent of public instruction in Kansas (1895–96).  He was professor of history and sociology at Baker University (1896–99) and assumed the presidency of Upper Iowa University in 1899, serving until 1902 when he became president of Miami University.  He left Miami to become president of the University of Vermont 1911–1919. He was educational director of the Third Army occupying Germany following World War I.  He served as the third president of the University of the Philippines from 1921–1925.

For his service during World War I, he was awarded the Army Distinguished Service Medal and his commendation reads, in part: "As Director in charge of the Educational Work undertaken in the Third Army of the American Expeditionary Forces, by his marked ability, untiring energy, and loyal devotion to his task, Dr. Benton contributed in a large measure to the successful results obtained in this vast undertaking. Through his great work among 10,000 illiterate soldiers over 8,000 of them were taught to read and write. By his efforts he has rendered services of particular worth to the American Expeditionary Forces."

He was an ordained Methodist minister.

Benton was a graduate of Ohio Wesleyan University where he was a member of Phi Delta Theta fraternity, of which he was national president 1912–14.  For his help in the founding of Delta Zeta, he was named Grand Patron and is the only man ever permitted to wear the Delta Zeta member badge. He was a member of the forensics honorary Tau Kappa Alpha and served as its national president 1915–17.

In 1889 he married Dolla Konantz of Arcadia, Kansas and they had two daughters, Helen Geneva (Mrs. Dwight E. Minnich) and Pauline Corinth.

He died in Minneapolis, Minnesota and is buried next to his wife in the Miami University plot of the Oxford Cemetery and his headstone indicates that he was "President of Miami University" and "National President of Phi Delta Theta Fraternity."  Two buildings on the Miami University campus have been named  for him.  First was the administration building and auditorium now known as Hall Auditorium and the current Benton Hall is an engineering building.

Sources
Encyclopedia Vermont Biography: A Series of Authentic Biographical Sketches of the Representative Men of Vermont and Sons of Vermont in Other States. Dodge. Burlington: Ullery, 1912, p 118-119

External links
 

Ohio Northern University alumni
Ohio Wesleyan University alumni
Baker University alumni
College of Wooster alumni
Presidents of Miami University
Presidents of the University of Vermont
American expatriates in the Philippines
Upper Iowa University
University of the Philippines people
People from Kenton, Ohio
Baker University faculty
1865 births
1927 deaths
Burials at Oxford Cemetery, Oxford, Ohio
Phi Delta Theta
Delta Zeta
Recipients of the Distinguished Service Medal (US Army)
Presidents of universities and colleges in the Philippines